Mariko Tabitha Hill (born 20 November 1995) is a Hong Kong cricketer who plays for Hong Kong women's national cricket team and is a former captain. She has represented Hong Kong at 2010 Asian Games and the 2014 Asian Games. In May 2021, she was named in the Jade Jets' squad for the 2021 Hong Kong Women's Premier League. In April 2022, it was announced that she would be training with Northern Diamonds for the upcoming season. In May 2022, she was added to the side's full squad, and made her debut for the side on 29 May against North West Thunder.

References

External links 
 Cricinfo

1995 births
Living people
Hong Kong people
Hong Kong women cricketers
Hong Kong women Twenty20 International cricketers
Cricketers at the 2010 Asian Games
Cricketers at the 2014 Asian Games
Asian Games competitors for Hong Kong
Northern Diamonds cricketers